Raymond Greenleaf (born Roger Ramon Greenleaf; January 1, 1892 – October 29, 1963) was an American actor, best known for All the King's Men (1949), Angel Face (1952), and Pinky (1949).

Early life
He was born as Roger Ramon Greenleaf on January 1, 1892 in Gloucester, Massachusetts.

Career
In the early 1920s, Greenleaf acted with the Jack X. Lewis Company in summer stock theatre. He had earlier performed with stock theater companies in Boston and in Bridgeport, Connecticut. In the fall of 1921, he was with the Orpheum Players in Ottawa, Canada.

Greenleaf's Broadway credits include Alice in Wonderland (1947), Yellow Jack (1947), A Pound on Demand / Androcles and the Lion (1946), King Henry VIII (1946), Foxhole in the Parlor (1945), Decision (1944), Jason (1942), and Your Loving Son (1941).

Death
Greenleaf died in Woodland Hills, Los Angeles, California at the age of 71 and is buried at Oakwood Memorial Park Cemetery, Chatsworth, California

Partial filmography

 The Naked City (1948) – City Editor (uncredited)
 Deep Waters (1948) – Judge Tate (uncredited)
 For the Love of Mary (1948) – Justice Williams
 State Department: File 649 (1949) – Examining Board Member (uncredited)
 A Kiss in the Dark (1949) – Martin Soames
 Slattery's Hurricane (1949) – Adm. William F. Olenby
 Pinky (1949) – Judge Shoreham
 All the King's Men (1949) – Judge Monte Stanton
 Port of New York (1949) – John J. Meredith (uncredited)
 East Side, West Side (1949) – Horace Elcott Howland
 No Sad Songs for Me (1950) – Mr. Caswell
 A Ticket to Tomahawk (1950) – Mayor (uncredited)
 David Harding, Counterspy (1950) – Dr. George Vickers
 On the Isle of Samoa (1950) – Peter Appleton
 Harriet Craig (1950) – Henry Fenwick
 Al Jennings of Oklahoma (1951) – Judge Jennings
 Storm Warning (1951) – Faulkner
 Pier 23 (1951) – Father Donovan
 As Young as You Feel (1951) – Bill (uncredited)
 The Secret of Convict Lake (1951) – Tom Fancher (uncredited)
 A Millionaire for Christy (1951) – Benjamin Chandler
 The Family Secret (1951) – Henry Archer Sims
 Ten Tall Men (1951) – Sheik Ben Allal
 FBI Girl (1951) – Governor Owen Grisby
 Deadline – U.S.A. (1952) – Lawrence White (uncredited)
 Paula (1952) – President Russell
 Washington Story (1952) – John Sheldon
 She's Working Her Way Through College (1952) – Dean Rogers
 Bonzo Goes to College (1952) – Dean Williams (uncredited)
 Horizons West (1952) – Eli Dodson
 Angel Face (1953) – Arthur Vance
 The Bandits of Corsica (1953) – Paoli
 South Sea Woman (1953) – Captain at Court-martial
 The Last Posse (1953) – Arthur Hagan
 Three Sailors and a Girl (1953) – B.P. Morrow – Bank President
 Living It Up (1954) – Conductor
 The Violent Men (1955) – Dr. Henry Crowell (uncredited)
 Violent Saturday (1955) – Mr. Fairchild (uncredited)
 Son of Sinbad (1955) – Simon Aristides
 Headline Hunters (1955) – Paul Strout
 Texas Lady (1955) – Knox (uncredited)
 Never Say Goodbye (1956) – Dr. Kelly Andrews
 When Gangland Strikes (1956) – Luke Ellis
 Over-Exposed (1956) – Max West
 You Can't Run Away from It (1956) – Minister
 Three Violent People (1956) – Carleton
 Spoilers of the Forest (1957) – Clyde Walters
 Monkey on My Back (1957) – Dr. A.J. Latham
 The Vampire (1957) – Autopsy Surgeon (uncredited)
 The Night the World Exploded (1957) – Gov. Chaney
 No Time to Be Young (1957) – The Dean (uncredited)
 Jeanne Eagels (1957) – Elderly Lawyer (uncredited)
 Official Detective – Episode: "Extortion" (1958) – Paul Nidemyer
 Quantrill's Raiders (1958) – General (uncredited)
 The Buccaneer (1958) – Junior State Senator
 The Story on Page One (1959) – Judge Carey
 From the Terrace (1960) – Fritz Thornton
 Wild in the Country (1961) – Dr. Underwood
 Birdman of Alcatraz (1962) – Judge (uncredited)

References

External links
 
 

1892 births
1963 deaths
20th-century American male actors
American male film actors
American male television actors
Burials at Oakwood Memorial Park Cemetery
Male actors from Los Angeles
Male actors from Massachusetts
People from Gloucester, Massachusetts